The Blackwater Ecological Preserve is a  Natural Area Preserve located in the area of Zuni, Virginia and owned by Old Dominion University.  It is home to flatwoods of longleaf pine and turkey oak and savannas of longleaf pine, two of the rarest plant communities in Virginia.  The longleaf pine savanna is the northernmost natural occurrence of such a plant community in the United States. Research on longleaf pine survival rates are currently being performed by Old Dominion University. 

The preserve is open to public visitation only through prior arrangement with Old Dominion University.

See also
 List of Virginia Natural Area Preserves

References

External links
Old Dominion University: Blackwater Ecological Preserve
Virginia Department of Conservation and Recreation: Blackwater Ecological Preserve

Virginia Natural Area Preserves
Protected areas of Isle of Wight County, Virginia
Old Dominion University